Arkoma is a town in Le Flore County, Oklahoma, United States. It is part of the Fort Smith, Arkansas-Oklahoma Metropolitan Statistical Area. The population was 1,989 at the 2010 census, a decline from 2,180 in 2000. The name of the town is a portmanteau of Arkansas and Oklahoma. Throughout its history, Arkoma has served as a "bedroom community" because many residents commuted to work in Fort Smith.

History
The community of Arkoma was established circa 1911 on land owned by Captain James Reynolds, a Civil War veteran who had married into the Choctaw Nation. He decided to develop his property as a suburb of Fort Smith, constructed houses to rent, and persuaded the Fort Smith Light and Traction Company to build tracks and run a regular electric trolley route to his new community. The streetcar line ceased operating in 1917.

Arkoma was incorporated as a town in 1946.

Geography
Arkoma is located at  (35.349516, -94.437558). It is located on the same side of the Arkansas River as Fort Smith, Arkansas, and is bounded by the Poteau River to the west and north, and the Arkansas-Oklahoma state line to the east.

Arkoma enjoys a temperate climate with often mild winters and hot summers. Arkoma is near an area known as Tornado Alley.

Demographics

As of the census of 2010, there were 1,989 people living in the town. The racial makeup of the town was 89.22% White, 0.41% African American, 5.78% Native American, 0.32% Asian, 0.87% from other races, and 3.39% from two or more races. Hispanic or Latino of any race were 1.83% of the population.

There were 877 households, out of which 28.4% had children under the age of 18 living with them, 50.4% were married couples living together, 13.5% had a female householder with no husband present, and 32.0% were non-families. 28.6% of all households were made up of individuals, and 10.5% had someone living alone who was 65 years of age or older. The average household size was 2.43 and the average family size was 2.97.

In the town, the population was spread out, with 24.6% under the age of 18, 8.8% from 18 to 24, 25.9% from 25 to 44, 25.8% from 45 to 64, and 15.0% who were 65 years of age or older. The median age was 38 years. For every 100 females, there were 96.8 males. For every 100 females age 18 and over, there were 90.9 males.

The median income for a household in the town was $23,718, and the median income for a family was $31,500. Males had a median income of $24,200 versus $17,104 for females. The per capita income for the town was $13,467. About 17.0% of families and 20.1% of the population were below the poverty line, including 26.8% of those under age 18 and 18.0% of those age 65 or over.

References

External links
 Arkoma High School
 Arkoma Public Library
 Encyclopedia of Oklahoma History and Culture - Arkoma
 Oklahoma Digital Maps: Digital Collections of Oklahoma and Indian Territory

Towns in LeFlore County, Oklahoma
Towns in Oklahoma
Fort Smith metropolitan area